Cerium(III) sulfide, also known as cerium sesquisulfide, is an inorganic compound with the formula Ce2S3. It is the sulfide salt of cerium(III) and exists as three polymorphs with different crystal structures.

Its high melting point (comparable to silica or alumina) and chemically inert nature have led to occasional examination of potential use as a refractory material for crucibles, but it has never been widely adopted for this application.

The distinctive red colour of two of the polymorphs (α- and β-Ce2S3) and aforementioned chemical stability up to high temperatures have led to some limited commercial use as a red pigment (known as cerium sulfide red).

Synthesis 
The oldest syntheses reported for the of cerium(III) sulfide follow a typical rare earth sesquisulfide formation route, which involves heating the corresponding cerium sesquioxide to 900–1100 °C in an atmosphere of hydrogen sulfide:

 Ce2O3 +  3 H2S →  Ce2S3 +  3 H2O

Newer synthetic procedures utilise less toxic carbon disulfide gas for sulfurisation, starting from cerium dioxide which is reduced by the CS2 gas at temperatures of 800–1000 °C:

 6 CeO2 +  5 CS2 → 3 Ce2S3 + 5 CO2 + SO2

Polymorphs 

Ce2S3 exists in three polymorphic forms: α-Ce2S3 (orthorhombic, burgundy colour), β-Ce2S3 (tetragonal, red colour), γ-Ce2S3 (cubic, black colour). They are analogous to the crystal structures of the likewise trimorphic Pr2S3 and Nd2S3.

Following the synthetic procedures given above will yield mostly the α- and β- polymorphs, with the proportion of α-Ce2S3 increasing at lower temperatures (~700–900 °C) and with longer reaction times. The α- form can be irreversibly transformed into β-Ce2S3 by vacuum heating at 1200 °C for 7 hours. Then γ-Ce2S3 is obtained from sintering of β-Ce2S3 powder via hot pressing at an even higher temperature (1700 °C).

α polymorph 
The α polymorph of cerium(III) sulfide has the same structure as α-. It contains both 7-coordinate and 8-coordinate cerium ions, with monocapped and bicapped trigonal prismatic coordination geometry, respectively. The sulfide ions, are 5-coordinate. Two thirds of them adopt a square pyramidal geometry and one third adopt a trigonal bipyramidal geometry.

γ polymorph 
The γ polymorph of cerium(III) sulfide adopts a cation-deficient form of the  structure. 8 out the 9 metal positions in the  structure are occupied by cerium in γ-, with the remainder as vacancies. This composition can be represented by the formula . The cerium ions are 8-coordinate while the sulfide ions are 6-coordinate (distorted octahedral).

Reactions 
Some reported reactions of cerium(III) sulfide are with bismuth compounds in order to form superconducting crystalline materials of the M(O,F)BiS2 family (for M=Ce).

The reaction of Ce2S3 with Bi2S3 and Bi2O3 in a sealed tube at 950 °C gives the parent compound CeOBiS2:
 3 Ce2S3 + Bi2S3 + 2 Bi2O3 →  6 CeOBiS2
This material is superconducting on its own, but the properties can be enhanced if it is doped with fluoride by including BiF3 in the reaction mixture.

Applications

Refractory material 
Cerium(III) and cerium(IV) sulfides were first investigated in the 1940s as part of the Manhattan project, where they were considered -but eventually not adopted- as advanced refractory materials. Their suggested application was as the material in crucibles for the casting of uranium and plutonium metal.

Although the sulfide's properties (high melting point and large, large negative ΔfG° and chemical inertness) are suitable and cerium is a relatively common element (66 ppm, about as much as copper), the danger of the traditional H2S-involving production route and the difficulty in controlling the formation of the resulting Ce2S3/CeS solid mixture meant that the compound was ultimately not developed further for such applications.

Pigment and other uses 
The main non-research use of cerium(III) sulfide is as a specialty inorganic pigment. The strong red hues of α- and β-Ce2S3, non-prohibitive cost of cerium, and chemically inert behaviour up to high temperature are the factors which make the compound desirable as a pigment.

Regarding other applications, the γ-Ce2S3 polymorph has a band gap of 2.06 eV and high Seebeck coefficient, thus it has been proposed as a high-temperature semiconductor for thermoelectric generators. A practical implementation thereof has not been demonstrated so far.

References 

Sulfides
Cerium(III) compounds
Refractory materials
Inorganic pigments